The 1996 Monaco Grand Prix (formally the LIV Grand Prix Automobile de Monaco) was a Formula One motor race held at Monaco on 19 May 1996. It was the sixth race of the 1996 Formula One season. The race was run in very wet weather,  and set a record for the fewest cars to be running at the end of a Grand Prix race, with the three podium finishers being the only cars left. 

Olivier Panis scored his first and only win of his Formula One career, earning the last Formula One victory for the Ligier team, and the first ever for engine manufacturer Mugen-Honda, after switching to slick tyres in a well-timed pitstop. Second place went to David Coulthard in a McLaren-Mercedes. Johnny Herbert was the last finisher in a Sauber, scored his only points of the season. 

This was the last win by a French Formula One driver until Pierre Gasly won the 2020 Italian Grand Prix.

Report

Practice and qualifying
Michael Schumacher had taken pole position but had caused controversy on his slowing down lap when he impeded Gerhard Berger right at the end of the session. Coming out of the tunnel Schumacher was cruising slowly, acknowledging the crowd, while Berger was on a fast lap. Schumacher tried to get out of Berger's way but the Austrian had to spin at high speed to avoid the Ferrari, entering the chicane backwards.

The Ligiers were 14th and 17th in qualifying, both below their expectations after the team had mis-firing issues, preventing a top six position.

Race day
Olivier Panis was fastest in the warm-up. Jacques Villeneuve was 18th after running a wet-setup in preparation for the expected rain. Between the warm-up session and the race, heavy rain fell at the circuit, and an additional 15-minute session was added to allow the drivers to get used to the changed conditions as it was the first time rain had fallen over the race weekend. The session took place at 13:15 CEST (GMT +2). Several drivers went off during the session, including Pedro Lamy, Pedro Diniz and Giancarlo Fisichella, but all continued. The only two drivers to escape with damage were Mika Häkkinen and Andrea Montermini. Jean Alesi suffered a puncture at the end of the session, but was able to return to the pitlane. Several drivers opted to skip the session. The Footwork team chose not to participate as they did not have any spare parts, and any crash would have marked the end of their weekend. Häkkinen was fastest, setting his time before his crash, with Alesi, Rubens Barrichello and Johnny Herbert behind. The two Williams cars were 7th and 8th, Villeneuve ahead of Damon Hill with Schumacher behind them in 9th.

The race started at 14:30 CEST. During the warm-up session, Montermini crashed his Forti coming out of the tunnel, and the team's lack of a spare car meant the Italian was unable to start, leaving 21 cars on the grid. Hill overtook Schumacher into Sainte-Dévote, while further back, Jos Verstappen, who had opted to start the race on slicks, slid straight into the wall. The two Minardis were then eliminated when they tangled coming out of the first corner. Hill began to pull away while polesitter Schumacher lost control coming out of Lower Mirabeau and hit the wall. Coming into the Rascasse, Barrichello spun and retired. After five laps, there were only 13 cars remaining as Ukyo Katayama (accident), Ricardo Rosset (accident) and Diniz (transmission) retired. A significant gap began to open between the leaders and Eddie Irvine in fourth. A queue of eight cars formed behind the slow Ferrari. Berger retired from third place on the 10th lap with gearbox trouble leaving 12 cars, while Heinz-Harald Frentzen damaged his front wing trying to pass Irvine, dropping to second last, ahead of Luca Badoer.

On lap 31, Martin Brundle spun off, which left only 11 cars in the race. Three laps later, Irvine was passed when Panis forced his way through at the Loews hairpin. Irvine lost control, became stuck and had undone his seatbelts before he restarted his car with the assistance of the marshals. Hill, meanwhile, had briefly lost the lead to Alesi when he made a pit stop on lap 30 to change to slicks as the track began to dry, but regained it a lap later when he overtook the Frenchman (who was still on wet tyres) on the track. Alesi made his pit stop shortly afterwards, allowing Hill to extend his lead to nearly 30 seconds and continue untroubled at the front until the 40th lap, when a failed oil pump caused his engine to blow coming out of the tunnel, his first retirement of the season. Alesi then led for 20 laps, before his suspension failed, handing the lead to Panis. Luca Badoer was running six laps down in the Forti when he collided with Villeneuve at Mirabeau on lap 66, retiring both drivers.

The race did not run its full distance as the two-hour time limit came into effect. Panis was leading David Coulthard by a small margin with only five other cars behind them. Irvine spun at the same point that his teammate Schumacher had crashed, and as he tried to rejoin, he was hit by Mika Salo, who was in turn hit by Häkkinen. All three cars retired, leaving only four cars circulating, with Frentzen running last. The German decided to pull into the pits on the final lap as he was running last anyway, and everyone else had already taken the checkered flag. Panis thus won his one and only Grand Prix, taking Ligier's first win in 15 seasons. Frentzen, Salo and Häkkinen were classified in the final points positions with Irvine credited with seventh place.

Classification

Qualifying

Race

Championship standings after the race

Drivers' Championship standings

Constructors' Championship standings

 Note: Only the top five positions are included for both sets of standings.

References

External links
F1 Rejects – Last Hurrah for Les Bleus: Monaco 1996

Monaco Grand Prix
Monaco Grand Prix
Grand Prix
Monaco Grand Prix